KWSL (1470 AM) is an American radio station licensed to serve the community of Sioux City, Iowa.  The station is owned by iHeartMedia and the broadcast license is held by iHM Licenses, LLC. It formerly aired the 24/7 syndicated Comedy format. Presently the station broadcasts in Spanish and calls itself "La Preciosa".

The station was most recently assigned the "KWSL" call sign by the Federal Communications Commission on October 2, 1995. These call letters were previously used for the Top 40 format through the 1980s.

References

External links
1470 KWSL official website

WSL
Adult hits radio stations in the United States
Radio stations established in 1938
1938 establishments in Iowa
IHeartMedia radio stations